The Pauls Valley Democrat is a tri-weekly newspaper published in Pauls Valley, Oklahoma, United States, covering Pauls Valley and other communities in Garvin County. It is owned by Community Newspaper Holdings Inc.

In May 2011, the paper adopted its current name after reducing its frequency to three issues a week. It was previously called the Pauls Valley Daily Democrat and published five editions per week.

References

External links
 Pauls Valley Democrat Website
 CNHI Website

Newspapers published in Oklahoma
Garvin County, Oklahoma